is a Japanese politician of the Liberal Democratic Party (LDP), a member of the House of Representatives in the Diet (national legislature).

A native of Kōriyama, Fukushima and graduate of the University of Tokyo he joined the Ministry of Construction (which is now part of Ministry of Land, Infrastructure and Transport) in 1974. Leaving the ministry in 1991 he was elected to the Diet for the first time in 1993. Nemoto was appointed as Minister for Reconstruction in the Second Abe Cabinet on 26 December 2012.

Nemoto has served as the Minister of Health, Labour and Welfare from 2 October 2018 to 11 September 2019. As a member of a parliamentary committee responding to a petition advocating a law prohibiting businesses from forcing female workers to wear high-heeled shoes (KuToo movement), he expressed that it was "necessary and reasonable" to mandate this for female workers.

See also 
 KuToo movement

References

External links 
 Official website in Japanese.
 Cabinet Secretariat bio

Ministers of Health, Labour and Welfare of Japan
1951 births
Living people
Politicians from Fukushima Prefecture
University of Tokyo alumni
Members of the House of Representatives (Japan)
Liberal Democratic Party (Japan) politicians
21st-century Japanese politicians